The men's pole vault event  at the 2001 IAAF World Indoor Championships was held on March 10.

Results

References
Results

Pole
Pole vault at the World Athletics Indoor Championships